Ruslan Ivanov (born 19 February 1987) is a Bulgarian footballer who currently plays for Vihren Sandanski as a midfielder.

References

1987 births
Living people
Bulgarian footballers
First Professional Football League (Bulgaria) players
Second Professional Football League (Bulgaria) players
FC Hebar Pazardzhik players
OFC Vihren Sandanski players
PFC Pirin Blagoevgrad players
PFC Vidima-Rakovski Sevlievo players
FC Bansko players
PFC Litex Lovech players
OFC Pirin Blagoevgrad players
FC Septemvri Simitli players
Association football midfielders
Bulgarian expatriate footballers
Bulgarian expatriate sportspeople in Greece
Expatriate footballers in Greece